Marcia Myers Bonta (born 1940) is an American naturalist and writer, known for her extensive writings about Pennsylvanian flora and fauna.

Biography 
Marcia Bonta was born on July 11, 1940, in Camden, New Jersey.  She earned a BA degree from Bucknell University in 1962, and has done extensive research on the history of women naturalists. She is the author of more than 300 articles and a long-running column in the Pennsylvania Game News.

Selected works
 Escape to the Mountain, A. S. Barnes (San Diego, CA), 1980
 Outbound Journeys in Pennsylvania, Pennsylvania State University Press (University Park, PA), 1988
 Appalachian Spring, University of Pittsburgh Press (Pittsburgh, PA), 1991
 Women in the Field: America's Pioneering Women Naturalists, Texas A&M University Press (College Station, TX), 1991
 Appalachian Autumn, University of Pittsburgh Press (Pittsburgh, PA), 1994
 American Women Afield: Writings by Pioneering Women Naturalists, Editor, Texas A&M University Press (College Station, TX), 1995
 More Outbound Journeys in Pennsylvania, Pennsylvania State University Press (University Park, PA), 1995
 Appalachian Summer, University of Pittsburgh Press (Pittsburgh, PA), 1999

Awards 
 1989: Book of the year award from Pennsylvania Outdoor Writers Association for Outbound Journeys in Pennsylvania.

References 

1940 births
Living people
American women scientists
American naturalists
Bucknell University alumni
20th-century American women writers
20th-century American non-fiction writers
American nature writers
Writers from Pennsylvania
American women non-fiction writers
21st-century American women